Neeli is a 2016 Indian-Tamil-language soap opera starring Chavi, Naveen, Niranjani and Kavitha Gowda. It aired on Vijay TV. The show is launched on 19 December 2016 and ended with 260 Episodes. The show is an adaptation of the Kannada Suvarna TV serial Neeli. It also airs in Sri Lanka Tamil Channel on Shakthi TV from 8 May 2017.

The series is said to reveal that a dead mother's ghost will protect her baby Abi who always shares her emotions with her doll Neeli.

Synopsis
It is a story about Abhirami loses her mother Divya at a very young age and is devastated when her father remarries. Rekha is trying to separate Abi from her husband. It is then that Divya, like an angel, protects Abhi from the troubles of life. At that time, Anjali enters the picture. As she is an amnesiac, she enters the family. Anjali and Abhi soon bond. Divya appears in front of Anjali and both try to find the miseries in Divya's death. In that process Divya helps Anjali indirectly in many occasions and she tries to make Anjali to fall for Surya. Some incidents in the home make others to hate Anjali. A function named Thalikorthal comes and everyone conceals the place of function to Anjali. Divya appears to Surya and helps Anjali to reach the place. When Anjali enters the Mangalsutra fells from Rekha's neck. Iyer of the temple suggests the Mangalsutra should be tied again by him after doing some rituals. In the meantime Divya's father comes to meet Rekha, and realises that Divya's soul is doing all such things with the help of Anjali. So he decides to make her soul to achieve peace. So they all go to meet a Sidhar. There Sidhar meets Rekha and tells her to do some rituals at different temples of all Devis. So Rekha leaves the home to visit all temples. Divya's father asks a promise from Divya not to make any problems any more. Rekha performs some difficult rituals in temples which includes wearing thorn shoes, handles fire involves ritual, etc. So Surya feels bad for her and understands she is doing all such things for him and for his welfare and good life. Overfelt Surya decides to meet the same Sidhar to ask for an alternative. Sidhar tells him to make Divya calm which is the only way to make all problems solve. Sidhar helps him to see Divya and Divya says she wants to spend some time with him and Abi. She says she wants to spend a week with Abi by entering  in Anjali's body. Surya initially refuses but Abi also wants to spend time with her parents. Surya seeks Anjali's help but she refuses to go with them. After discussing with Divya, Anjali agrees to spend a week with them. They individually tell some fake reasons to home mates and leaves home. Without the knowledge of Rekha, they visits a motel in ECR.

Cast

Main
 Chavi Sharma as Abhirami (Surya and Divya's daughter)
 Navin Vetri as Surya (Abhi's father)
 Nandhini as Anjali (Abhi's caretaker)
 Niranjani as Divya (Abhi's mother/Surya's first wife)
 Kavitha Gowda as Rekha (Surya's second wife/ Abhi's stepmother)
 Devipriya as Kamatchi (Anjali's caretaker; episodes 222–260)
 Tanisha Kuppanda as Thulasi (a witch)
 Doll as Neeli (a ghost)

Recurring
 Vikash as Dheena (Rekha's younger brother and Abhi's uncle)
 Jeevitha
 Mani KL as Chandru
 Rekha Krishnappa as Devayani (Rekha's elder sister)
S.Kavitha as Dr Lakshmi
 Kamal as Shakthi
 Deepika as Sathiya wife (epidsodes 204–206)
 Ashwin Kumar as Sathiya (episodes 203–206)

Awards and nominations

International broadcast
The Series was released on 19 December 2016 on Vijay TV and Vijay TV HD. The Show was also broadcast internationally on Channel's international distribution. 
 It was aired in Sri Lanka, Singapore, Vietnam, Japan, Hong Kong, United States, Europe, Malaysia, Mauritius and South Africa on Vijay TV. 
 In Canada, the drama airs on Tamil Canadians-oriented channel on Asian Television Network at 19:30, after 9:30 hours its original Tamil Nadu broadcast at 18:30 (CST).
 In Sri Lanka Tamil Channel on Shakthi TV. It airs Monday through Friday at 8:00PM (SST) with Sinhala Subtitle from 8 May 2017.
 The drama is episodes on their app hotstar, some Episodes with English subtitle.
 It is also available via the internet protocol television service on Lebara Play.

References

External links
Official website

Star Vijay original programming
Tamil-language horror fiction television series
Tamil-language television series based on Kannada-language television series
2016 Tamil-language television series debuts
Tamil-language television shows
Tamil-language thriller television series
2017 Tamil-language television series endings